Cannane may refer to:

 Steve Cannane (born 1970), Australian television journalist
 The Cannanes, Australian indie rock band formed in 1984